The Gambler, the Girl and the Gunslinger is a 2009 American made for television Western drama directed by Anne Wheeler, starring Dean Cain, James Tupper and Allison Hossack. Two mortal enemies must band together to defend the ranch they've both staked their claim to.

Plot summary
The Gambler wins half the ranch in a card game. The Gunslinger is not pleased with losing half a ranch.  The Girl loves the Gunslinger.  A band of a few hundred bandits invade with plans for a new nation.  The US army plans to blow everything up to defend the USA.  The Gambler likes the Girl, and stays on to help, saving the Gunslinger because of her.  Then Gambler and Gunslinger blow up a few rebels. The Gambler, the Girl and the Gunslinger live happily (maybe) ever after on the ranch.

Cast
 Dean Cain as Shea McCall, The Gambler
 James Tupper as BJ Stoker, The Gunslinger
 Allison Hossack as Liz Calhoun, The Girl
 Keith MacKechnie as Cal Stoomey (as Keith Mackechnie)  
 Michael Eklund as Red  
 John DeSantis as Mule (as John Desantis)  
 Teach Grant as Joker  
 Serge Houde as Marshal  
 Alejandro Abellan as Diego  
 Garwin Sanford as The General  
 Sheldon Yamkovy as Sergeant

References

External links 
 
 

Hallmark Channel original films
2009 television films
2009 films
Films with screenplays by Larry Cohen